Issoudun may refer to:

 Issoudun, Indre, a commune in the Indre department, France
 Canton of Issoudun, a canton centered in Issoudun, Indre
 Arrondissement of Issoudun, an arrondissement centered in Issoudun, Indre
 Issoudun Aerodrome, an aerodrome in Issoudun, Indre
 Issoudun-Létrieix, a village in the Creuse department, France
 Issoudun, Quebec, a municipality in Quebec, Canada.

See also
 Exoudun